Robert Locksdale "Robbie" Stuart (born 9 January 1948) is a former New Zealand rugby union player. A lock, Stuart represented Hawke's Bay at a provincial level, and was a member of the New Zealand national side, the All Blacks, on their 1977 tour of Italy and France. He played six matches for the All Blacks including one international, and captained the team in two matches against French selections.

References

1948 births
Living people
Rugby union players from Napier, New Zealand
People educated at Napier Boys' High School
New Zealand rugby union players
New Zealand international rugby union players
Hawke's Bay rugby union players
Rugby union locks
Rugby union props
New Zealand rugby union coaches